The 2018 Alcorn State Braves football team represented Alcorn State University in the 2018 NCAA Division I FCS football season. The Braves were led by third-year head coach Fred McNair and played their home games at Casem-Spinks Stadium. They were members of the East Division of the Southwestern Athletic Conference (SWAC).

Previous season
The Braves finished the 2017 season 7–5, 5–2 in SWAC play to win the East Division. They lost the SWAC Championship Game to Grambling State.

Preseason

SWAC football media day
During the SWAC football media day held in Birmingham, Alabama on July 13, 2018, the Braves were predicted to win the East Division.

Media poll

Presason All-SWAC Team
The Braves had 10 players at 11 positions selected to Preseason All-SWAC Teams which was the second most behind Grambling State's 15. Running back P.J. Simmons was also selected as the preseason offensive player of the year.

Offense

1st team

Noah Johnson – Jr. QB

P.J. Simmons – Sr. RB

Mustaffa Ibrahim – Jr. OL

2nd team

Deonte Brooks – Jr. OL

Kevin Hall – Jr. OL

Defense

1st team

Trae Ferrell – Sr. LB

2nd team

Sterling Shippy – Sr. DL

Solomon Muhammad – Jr. LB

Brady Smith – Sr. DB

Special teams

Corey McCullough – Jr. K/P, selected for both positions

Award watch lists

Schedule

Source: Schedule

Despite also being a member of the SWAC, the game vs Texas Southern will be considered a non conference game and will have no effect on the SWAC standings.

Game summaries

at Georgia Tech

Louisiana College

Texas Southern

at Mississippi Valley State

at Southern

Alabama State

at Alabama A&M

Grambling State

at Prairie View A&M

at New Mexico State

Jackson State

References

Alcorn State
Alcorn State Braves football seasons
Southwestern Athletic Conference football champion seasons
Alcorn State Braves football